Fomichi is a rural locality (a village) in Dvurechenskoye Rural Settlement, Permsky District, Perm Krai, Russia. The population was 3 as of 2010. There are 2 streets.

Geography 
Fomichi is located 19 km south of Perm (the district's administrative centre) by road. Nestyukovo is the nearest rural locality.

References 

Rural localities in Permsky District